The WWA International Television Tag Team Championship was the tag team title in the Los Angeles-based Worldwide Wrestling Associates from the title's formation in 1954 (as the NWA International Television Tag Team Championship, renamed as a North American Wrestling Alliance title with that promotion's formation in 1958 and then as a WWA title in 1961 when the promotion was renamed) until 1964, when it was replaced with the WWA World Tag Team Championship.

Title history

References

Tag team wrestling championships
NWA Hollywood Wrestling championships